This is a list of reptiles in Madagascar.

Total number of species = 406

Snakes

Boas (Boidae)
 Acrantophis madagascariensis (Duméril & Bibron, 1844)
 Acrantophis dumerili (Jan, 1860)
 Sanzinia madagascariensis (Duméril & Bibron, 1844)

Elapidae
 Hydrophis platurus (Linnaeus, 1766)

Psammophiidae 

 Mimophis mahfalensis (Grandidier, 1867)
 Mimophis occultus Ruane, Myers, Lo, Yuen, Welt, Juman, Futterman, Nussbaum, Schneider, Burbrink & Raxworthy, 2017

Pseudoxyrhophiidae
 Alluaudina bellyi (Mocquard, 1894)
 Alluaudina mocquardi (Angel, 1939)
 Brygophis coulangesi (Domergue, 1988)
 Compsophis infralineatus (Günther, 1882)
 Compsophis boulengeri (Peracca, 1892)
 Compsophis albiventris (Mocquard, 1894)
 Compsophis vinckei (Domergue, 1988)
 Compsophis laphystius (Cadle, 1996)
 Compsophis zeny (Cadle, 1996)
 Compsophis fatsibe (Mercurio & Andreone, 2005)
 Dromicodryas bernieri (Duméril & Bibron, 1854)
 Dromicodryas quadrilineatus (Duméril & Bibron, 1854)
 Exallodontophis albignaci (Domergue, 1984)
 Heteroliodon occipitalis (Boulenger, 1896)
 Heteroliodon lava (Raxworthy & Nussbaum, 2000)
 Heteroliodon fohy (Glaw, Vences & Nussbaum, 2005)
 Ithycyphus goudoti (Schlegel, 1837)
 Ithycyphus miniatus (Schlegel, 1837)
 Ithycyphus oursi (Domergue, 1986)
 Ithycyphus perineti (Domergue, 1986)
 Ithycyphus blanci (Domergue, 1988)
 Langaha madagascariensis (Bonnaterre, 1790)
 Langaha alluaudi (Mocquard, 1901)
 Langaha pseudoalluaudi (Domergue, 1988)
 Leioheterodon madagascariensis (Duméril & Bibron, 1854)
 Leioheterodon modestus (Günther, 1863)
 Leioheterodon geayi (Mocquard, 1905)
 Liophidium rhodogaster (Schlegel, 1837)
 Liophidium torquatum (Boulenger, 1888)
 Liophidium trilineatum (Boulenger, 1896)
 Liophidium vaillanti (Mocquard, 1901)
 Liophidium apperti (Domergue, 1984)
 Liophidium chabaudi (Domergue, 1984)
 Liophidium therezieni (Domergue, 1984)
 Liophidium maintikibo (Franzen, Jones, Raselimanana, Nagy, C'Cruze, Glaw & Vences, 2009)
 Liophidium pattoni (Vieites, Ratsoavina, Randrianiaina, Nagy, Glaw & Vences, 2010)
 Liopholidophis sexlineatus (Günther, 1882)
 Liopholidophis varius (Fischer, 1884)
 Liopholidophis dolicocercus (Peracca, 1892)
 Liopholidophis grandidieri (Mocquard, 1904)
 Liopholidophis rhadinaea (Cadle, 1996)
 Liopholidophis dimorphus (Glaw, Nagy, Franzen & Vences, 2007)
 Liopholidophis baderi (Glaw, Kucharzewski, Nagy, Hawlitschek & Vences, 2013)
 Liopholidophis oligolepis (Glaw, Kucharzewski, Nagy, Hawlitschek & Vences, 2013)
 Lycodryas gaimardi (Schlegel, 1837)
 Lycodryas granuliceps (Boettger, 1877)
 Lycodryas guentheri (Boulenger, 1896)
 Lycodryas inornatus (Boulenger, 1896)
 Lycodryas carleti (Domergue, 1995)
 Lycodryas citrinus (Domergue, 1995)
 Lycodryas inopinae (Domergue, 1995)
 Lycodryas pseudogranuliceps (Domergue, 1995)
 Madagascarophis colubrinus (Schlegel, 1837)
 Madagascarophis meridionalis (Domergue, 1987)
 Madagascarophis ocellatus (Domergue, 1987)
 Madagascarophis fuchsi (Glaw, Kucharzewski, Nagy, Köhler & Vences, 2013)
 Micropisthodon ochraceus (Mocquard, 1894)
 Pararhadinaea melanogaster (Boettger, 1898)
 Parastenophis betsileanus (Günther, 1880)
 Phisalixella arctifasciata (Duméril & Bibron, 1854)
 Phisalixella variabilis (Boulenger, 1896)
 Phisalixella iarakaensis (Domergue, 1994)
 Phisalixella tulearensis (Domergue, 1995)
 Pseudoxyrhopus heterurus (Jan, 1863)
 Pseudoxyrhopus microps (Günther, 1881)
 Pseudoxyrhopus quinquelineatus (Günther, 1881)
 Pseudoxyrhopus imerinae (Günther, 1890)
 Pseudoxyrhopus tritaeniatus (Mocquard, 1894)
 Pseudoxyrhopus ambreensis (Mocquard, 1895)
 Pseudoxyrhopus ankafinaensis (Raxworthy & Nussbaum, 1994)
 Pseudoxyrhopus kely (Raxworthy & Nussbaum, 1994)
 Pseudoxyrhopus sokosoko (Raxworthy & Nussbaum, 1994)
 Pseudoxyrhopus analabe (Raxworthy', Andreone & Nussbaum, 1998)
 Pseudoxyrhopus oblectator (Cadle, 1999)
 Thamnosophis lateralis (Duméril & Bibron, 1854)
 Thamnosophis stumpffi (Boettger, 1881)
 Thamnosophis infrasignatus (Günther, 1882)
 Thamnosophis epistibes (Cadle, 1996)
 Thamnosophis martae (Glaw, Vences & Franzen, 2005)
 Thamnosophis mavotenda (Glaw, Nagy, Köhler, Franzen & Vences, 2009)

Typhlopidae
 Indotyphlops braminus (Daudun, 1803)
 Madatyphlops arenarius (Grandidier, 1872)
 Madatyphlops madagascariensis (Boettger, 1877)
 Madatyphlops mucronatus (Boettger, 1880)
 Madatyphlops reuteri (Boettger, 1881)
 Madatyphlops boettgeri (Boulenger, 1893)
 Madatyphlops decorsei (Mocquard, 1901)
 Madatyphlops microcephalus (Werner, 1909)
 Madatyphlops ocularis (Parker, 1927)
 Madatyphlops domerguei (Roux-Estève, 1980)
 Madatyphlops andasibensis (Wallach & Glaw, 2009)
 Madatyphlops rajeryi (Renoult & Raselimanana, 2009)

Xenotyphlopidae 

Xenotyphlops grandidieri (Mocquard, 1905)
 Xenotyphlops mocquardi (Wallach, Mecurio & Andreone, 2007)

Lizards

Agamids (Agamidae)
 Agama agama (Linnaeus, 1758)

Chameleons (Chamaeleonidae)
 Brookesia superciliaris (Kuhl, 1820)
 Brookesia ebenaui (Boettger, 1880)
 Brookesia minima (Boettger, 1893)
 Brookesia stumpffi (Boettger, 1894)
 Brookesia tuberculata (Mocquard, 1894)
 Brookesia dentata (Mocquard, 1900)
 Brookesia perarmata (Angel, 1933)
 Brookesia decaryi (Angel, 1939)
 Brookesia vadoni (Brygoo & Domergue, 1968)
 Brookesia thieli (Brygoo & Domergue, 1969)
 Brookesia karchei (Brygoo, Blanc & Domergue, 1970)
 Brookesia lambertoni (Brygoo & Domergue, 1970)
 Brookesia therezieni (Brygoo & Domergue, 1970)
 Brookesia betschi (Brygoo, Blanc & Domergue, 1974)
 Brookesia griveaudi (Brygoo, Blanc & Domergue, 1974)
 Brookesia peyrierasi (Brygoo & Domergue, 1974)
 Brookesia ramanantsoai (Brygoo & Domergue, 1975)
 Brookesia bonsi (Ramanantsoa, 1980)
 Brookesia valerieae (Raxworthy, 1991)
 Brookesia ambreensis (Raxworthy & Nussbaum, 1995)
 Brookesia antakarana (Raxworthy & Nussbaum, 1995)
 Brookesia bekolosy (Raxworthy & Nussbaum, 1995)
 Brookesia brygooi (Raxworthy & Nussbaum, 1995)
 Brookesia lineata (Raxworthy & Nussbaum, 1995)
 Brookesia exarmata (Schimmenti & Jesu, 1996)
 Brookesia brunoi (Crottini, Miralles, Glaw, Harris, Lima & Vences, 2012)
 Brookesia confidens (Glaw, Köhler, Towsend & Vences, 2012)
 Brookesia desperata (Glaw, Köhler, Towsend & Vences, 2012)
 Brookesia micra (Glaw, Köhler, Towsend & Vences, 2012)
 Brookesia tristis (Glaw, Köhler, Towsend & Vences, 2012)
 Calumma parsonii (Cuvier, 1824)
 Calumma cucullatum (Gray, 1831)
 Calumma nasutum (Duméril & Bibron, 1836)
 Calumma gallus (Günther, 1877)
 Calumma brevicorne (Günther, 1879)
 Calumma globifer (Günther, 1879)
 Calumma malthe (Günther, 1879)
 Calumma furcifer (Vaillant & Grandidier, 1880)
 Calumma oshaughnessyi (Günther, 1881)
 Calumma boettgeri (Boulenger, 1888)
 Calumma gastrotaenia (Boulenger, 1888)
 Calumma fallax (Mocquard, 1900)
 Calumma guibei (Hillenius, 1959)
 Calumma tsaratananense (Brygoo & Domergue, 1967)
 Calumma marojezense (Brygoo, Blanc & Domergue, 1970)
 Calumma andringitraense (Brygoo, Blanc & Domergue, 1972)
 Calumma capuroni (Brygoo, Blanc & Domergue, 1972)
 Calumma hilleniusi (Brygoo, Blanc & Domergue, 1973)
 Calumma ambreense (Ramanantsoa, 1974)
 Calumma guillaumeti (Brygoo, Blanc & Domergue, 1974)
 Calumma peyrierasi (Brygoo, Blanc & Domergue, 1974)
 Calumma glawi (Böhme, 1997)
 Calumma vatosoa (Andreone, Mattioli, Jesu & Randrianirina, 2001)
 Calumma vencesi (Andreone, Mattioli, Jesu & Randrianirina, 2001)
 Calumma amber (Raxworthy & Nussbaum, 2006)
 Calumma crypticum (Raxworthy & Nussbaum, 2006)
 Calumma hafahafa (Raxworthy & Nussbaum, 2006)
 Calumma jejy (Raxworthy & Nussbaum, 2006)
 Calumma peltierorum (Raxworthy & Nussbaum, 2006)
 Calumma tsycorne (Raxworthy & Nussbaum, 2006)
 Calumma tarzan (Gehring, Pabijan, Ratsoavina, Köhler, Vences & Glaw, 2010)
 Calumma vohibola (Gehring, Ratsoavina, Vences & Glaw, 2011)
 Furcifer bifidus (Brongniart, 1800)
 Furcifer pardalis (Cuvier, 1829)
 Furcifer verrucosus (Cuvier, 1829)
 Furcifer lateralis (Gray, 1831)
 Furcifer rhinoceratus (Gray, 1845)
 Furcifer balteatus (Duméril & Bibron, 1851)
 Furcifer antimena (Grandidier, 1872)
 Furcifer campani (Grandidier, 1872)
 Furcifer labordi (Grandidier, 1872)
 Furcifer minor (Günther, 1879)
 Furcifer willsii (Günther, 1890)
 Furcifer oustaleti (Mocquard, 1894)
 Furcifer petteri (Brygoo & Domergue, 1966)
 Furcifer angeli (Brygoo & Domergue, 1968)
 Furcifer belalandaensis (Brygoo & Domergue, 1970)
 Furcifer major (Brygoo, 1971)
 Furcifer tuzetae (Brygoo, Bourgat & Domergue, 1972)
 Furcifer nicosiai (Jesu, Mattioli & Schimmenti, 1999)
 Furcifer timoni (Glaw, Köhler & Vences, 2009)
 Furcifer viridis (Florio, Ingram, Rakotondravony, Louis jr. & Raxworthy, 2012)
 Palleon nasus (Boulenger, 1887)
 Palleon lolontany (Raxworthy & Nussbaum, 1995)

Gekkonidae (infraorder: Gekkota)

 Blaesodactylus boivini (Duméril, 1856)
 Blaesodactylus sakalava (Grandidier, 1867)
 Blaesodactylus antongilensis (Böhme & Meier, 1980)
 Blaesodactylus ambonihazo (Bauer, Glaw, Gehring & Vences, 2011)
 Ebenavia inunguis (Boettger, 1878)
 Ebenavia maintimainty (Raxworthy & Nussbaum, 1998)
 Geckolepis typica (Grandidier, 1867)
 Geckolepis maculata (Peters, 1880)
 Geckolepis polylepis (Boettger, 1893)
 Gehyra mutilata (Wiegmann, 1834)
 Hemidactylus frenatus (Schlegel, 1836)
 Hemidactylus mercatorius (Gray, 1842)
 Hemidactylus platycephalus (Peters, 1854)
 Lygodactylus tolampyae (Grandidier, 1872)
 Lygodactylus madagascariensis (Boettger, 1881)
 Lygodactylus bivittis (Peters, 1883)
 Lygodactylus pictus (Peters, 1883)
 Lygodactylus miops (Günther, 1891)
 Lygodactylus verticillatus (Mocquard, 1895)
 Lygodactylus heterurus (Boettger, 1913)
 Lygodactylus decaryi (Angel, 1930)
 Lygodactylus mirabilis (Pasteur, 1962)
 Lygodactylus arnoulti (Pasteur, 1965)
 Lygodactylus guibei (Pasteur, 1965)
 Lygodactylus klemmeri (Pasteur, 1965)
 Lygodactylus montanus (Pasteur, 1965)
 Lygodactylus ornatus (Pasteur, 1965)
 Lygodactylus tuberosus (Mertens, 1965)
 Lygodactylus blanci (Pasteur, 1967)
 Lygodactylus expectatus (Pasteur & Blanc, 1967)
 Lygodactylus rarus (Pasteur & Blanc, 1973)
 Lygodactylus pauliani (Pasteur & Blanc, 1991)
 Lygodactylus blancae (Pasteur, 1995)
 Lygodactylus intermedius (Pasteur, 1995)
 Lygodactylus roavolana (Puente, Glaw, Vieites & Vences, 2009)
 Matoatoa brevipes (Mocquard, 1900)
 Matoatoa spannringi (Raxworthy & Nussbaum & Pronk, 1998)
 Paragehyra petiti (Angel, 1929)
 Paragehyra gabriellae (Raxworthy & Nussbaum, 1994)
 Paroedura picta (Peters, 1854)
 Paroedura androyensis (Grandidier, 1867)
 Paroedura stumpffi (Boettger, 1879)
 Paroedura oviceps (Boettger, 1881)
 Paroedura gracilis (Boulenger, 1896)
 Paroedura bastardi (Mocquard, 1900)
 Paroedura homalorhina (Angel, 1936)
 Paroedura masobe (Raxworthy & Nussbaum, 1994)
 Paroedura ibityensis (Rösler & Krüger, 1998)
 Paroedura karstophila (Raxworthy & Nussbaum, 2000)
 Paroedura maingoka (Raxworthy & Nussbaum, 2000)
 Paroedura tanjaka (Raxworthy & Nussbaum, 2000)
 Paroedura vahiny (Raxworthy & Nussbaum, 2000)
 Paroedura vazimba (Raxworthy & Nussbaum, 2000)
 Paroedura lohatsara (Glaw, Vences & Nussbaum, 2001)
 Phelsuma cepediana (Milbert, 1812)
 Phelsuma madagascariensis (Gray, 1831)
 Phelsuma lineata (Gray, 1842)
 Phelsuma mutabilis (Grandidier, 1869)
 Phelsuma grandis (Gray, 1870)
 Phelsuma laticauda (Boettger, 1880)
 Phelsuma dubia (Boettger, 1881)
 Phelsuma quadriocellata (Peters, 1883)
 Phelsuma abbotti (Stejneger, 1893)
 Phelsuma breviceps (Boettger, 1894)
 Phelsuma standingi (Methuen & Hewitt, 1913)
 Phelsuma guttata (Kaudern, 1922)
 Phelsuma barbouri (Loveridge, 1942)
 Phelsuma kochi (Mertens, 1954)
 Phelsuma flavigularis (Mertens, 1962)
 Phelsuma serraticauda (Mertens, 1963)
 Phelsuma dorsivittata (Mertens, 1964)
 Phelsuma pusilla (Mertens, 1964)
 Phelsuma modesta (Mertens, 1970)
 Phelsuma parva (Meier, 1983)
 Phelsuma seippi (Meier, 1987)
 Phelsuma klemmeri (Seipp, 1991)
 Phelsuma antanosy (Raxworthy & Nussbaum, 1993)
 Phelsuma masohoala (Raxworthy & Nussbaum, 1994)
 Phelsuma pronki (Seipp, 1994)
 Phelsuma berghofi (Krügler, 1996)
 Phelsuma malamakibo (Nussbaum, Raxworthy, Raselimanana & Ramanamanjato, 2000)
 Phelsuma hielscheri (Rösler, 2001)
 Phelsuma kely (Schönecker, Bach & Glaw, 2004)
 Phelsuma vanheygeni (Lerner, 2004)
 Phelsuma ravenala (Raxworthy, Ingram, Rabibisoa & Pearson, 2007)
 Phelsuma borai (Glaw, Köhler & Vences, 2009)
 Phelsuma hoeschi (Berghof & Trautmann, 2009)
 Phelsuma roesleri (Glaw, Gehring, Köhler, Franzen & Vences, 2010)
 Phelsuma gouldi (Crottini, Gehring, Glaw, Harris, Lima & Vences, 2011)
 Uroplatus fimbriatus (Schneider, 1797)
 Uroplatus lineatus (Duméril & Bibron, 1836)
 Uroplatus ebenaui (Boettger, 1879)
 Uroplatus phantasticus (Boulenger, 1888)
 Uroplatus alluaudi (Mocquard, 1894)
 Uroplatus guentheri (Mocquard, 1908)
 Uroplatus sikorae (Boettger, 1913)
 Uroplatus henkeli (Böhme & Ibisch, 1990)
 Uroplatus sameiti (Böhme & Ibisch, 1990)
 Uroplatus malahelo (Raxworthy & Nussbaum, 1994)
 Uroplatus malama (Raxworthy & Nussbaum, 1995)
 Uroplatus pietschmanni (Böhle & Schönecker, 2004)
 Uroplatus giganteus (Glaw, Kosuch, Henkel, Sound & Böhme, 2006)
 Uroplatus finiavana (Ratsoavina, Louis jr., Crottini, Randrianiaina, Glaw & Vences, 2011)

Gerrhosauridae
 Tracheloptychus madagascariensis (Peters, 1854)
 Tracheloptychus petersi (Grandidier, 1869)
 Zonosaurus madagascariensis (Gray, 1831)
 Zonosaurus ornatus (Gray, 1831)
 Zonosaurus quadrilineatus (Grandidier, 1867)
 Zonosaurus karsteni (Grandidier, 1869)
 Zonosaurus laticaudatus (Grandidier, 1869)
 Zonosaurus aeneus (Grandidier, 1872)
 Zonosaurus rufipes (Boettger, 1881)
 Zonosaurus subunicolor (Boettger, 1881)
 Zonosaurus boettgeri (Steindachner, 1891)
 Zonosaurus maximus (Boulenger, 1896)
 Zonosaurus trilineatus (Angel, 1939)
 Zonosaurus haraldmeieri (Brygoo & Böhme, 1985)
 Zonosaurus brygooi (Lang & Böhme, 1990)
 Zonosaurus anelanelany (Nussbaum, Raxworthy & Raselimanana, 2000)
 Zonosaurus bemaraha (Nussbaum, Raxworthy & Raselimanana, 2000)
 Zonosaurus tsingy (Nussbaum, Raxworthy & Raselimanana, 2000)
 Zonosaurus maramaintso (Nussbaum, Raxworthy & Raselimanana, 2006)

Madagascan iguanas (Opluridae)
 Chalarodon madagascariensis (Peters, 1854)
 Oplurus cyclurus (Merren, 1820)
 Oplurus cuvieri (Gray, 1831)
 Oplurus quadrimaculatus (Duméril & Bibron, 1851)
 Oplurus fierinensis (Grandidier, 1869)
 Oplurus saxicola (Grandidier, 1869)
 Oplurus grandidieri (Mocquard, 1900)

Skinks (Scincidae)
 Amphiglossus astrolabi (Duméril & Bibron, 1839)
 Amphiglossus splendidus (Grandidier, 1872)
 Amphiglossus melanurus (Günther, 1877)
 Amphiglossus gastrostictus (O'Shaughnessy, 1879)
 Amphiglossus macrocercus (Günther, 1882)
 Amphiglossus frontoparietalis (Boulenger, 1889)
 Amphiglossus ornaticeps (Boulenger, 1896)
 Amphiglossus ardouini (Mocquard, 1897)
 Amphiglossus crenni (Mocquard, 1906)
 Amphiglossus reticulatus (Kaudern, 1922)
 Amphiglossus decaryi (Angel, 1930)
 Amphiglossus andranovahensis (Angel, 1933)
 Amphiglossus elongatus (Angel, 1933)
 Amphiglossus alluaudi (Brygoo, 1981)
 Amphiglossus tsaratananensis (Brygoo, 1981)
 Amphiglossus anosyensis (Raxworthy & Nussbaum, 1993)
 Amphiglossus mandokava (Raxworthy & Nussbaum, 1993)
 Amphiglossus punctatus (Raxworthy & Nussbaum, 1993)
 Amphiglossus mandady (Andreone & Greer, 2002)
 Amphiglossus spilostichus (Andreone & Greer, 2002)
 Amphiglossus stylus (Andreone & Greer, 2002)
 Amphiglossus tanysoma (Andreone & Greer, 2002)
 Amphiglossus meva (Miralles, Raselimanana, Rakotomalala, Vences & Vieines, 2011)
 Androngo trivittatus (Boulenger, 1896)
 Cryptoblepharus cognatus (Boettger, 1881)
 Cryptoblepharus voeltzkowi (Sternfeld, 1918)
 Madascincus igneocaudatus (Grandidier, 1867)
 Madascincus polleni (Grandidier, 1869)
 Madascincus mouroundavae (Grandidier, 1872)
 Madascincus melanopleura (Günther, 1877)
 Madascincus stumpffi (Boettger, 1882)
 Madascincus macrolepis (Boulenger, 1888)
 Madascincus ankodabensis (Angel, 1930)
 Madascincus minutus (Raxworthy & Nussbaum, 1993)
 Madascincus nanus (Andreone & Greer, 2002)
 Madascincus arenicola (Miralles, Köhler, Glaw & Vences, 2011)
 Paracontias holomelas (Günther, 1877)
 Paracontias hildebrandti (Peters, 1880)
 Paracontias brocchii (Mocquard, 1894)
 Paracontias rothschildi (Mocquard, 1905)
 Paracontias minimus (Mocquard, 1906)
 Paracontias milloti (Angel, 1949)
 Paracontias hafa (Andreone & Greer, 2002)
 Paracontias manify (Andreone & Greer, 2002)
 Paracontias tsararano (Andreone & Greer, 2002)
 Paracontias kankana (Köhler, Vieites, Glaw, Kaffenberger & Vences, 2009)
 Paracontias fasika (Köhler, Vences, Erbacher &Glaw, 2010)
 Paracontias vermisaurus (Miralles, Köhler, Vieites, Glaw & Vences, 2011)
 Pseudoacontias madagascariensis (Bocage, 1889)
 Pseudoacontias angelorum (Raxworthy & Nussbaum, 1995)
 Pseudoacontias menamainty (Andreone & Greer, 2002)
 Pseudoacontias unicolor (Sakata & Hikida, 2003)
 Pygomeles braconnieri (Grandidier, 1867)
 Pygomeles petteri (Pasteur & Blanc, 1962)
 Sirenoscincus yamagishii (Sakata & Hikida, 2003)
 Sirenoscincus mobydick (Miralles, Anjeriniaina, Hipsley, Müller, Glaw & Vences, 2012)
 Trachylepis gravenhorstii (Duméril & Bibron, 1839)
 Trachylepis comorensis (Peters, 1854)
 Trachylepis elegans (Peters, 1854)
 Trachylepis aureopunctata (Grandidier, 1867)
 Trachylepis boettgeri (Boulenger, 1887)
 Trachylepis betsileana (Mocquard, 1906)
 Trachylepis madagascariensis (Mocquard, 1908)
 Trachylepis vato (Raxworthy & Nussbaum, 1994)
 Trachylepis dumasi (Raxworthy & Nussbaum, 1995)
 Trachylepis lavarambo (Raxworthy & Nussbaum, 1998)
 Trachylepis nancycoutuae (Raxworthy & Nussbaum, 1998)
 Trachylepis tandrefana (Nussbaum, Raxworthy & Ramanamanjato, 1999)
 Trachylepis tavaratra (Nussbaum, Raxworthy & Ramanamanjato, 1999)
 Trachylepis vezo (Nussbaum, Raxworthy & Ramanamanjato, 1999)
 Trachylepis volamenaloha (Nussbaum, Raxworthy & Ramanamanjato, 1999)
 Voeltzkowia fierinensis (Grandidier, 1869)
 Voeltzkowia rubrocaudata (Grandidier, 1869)
 Voeltzkowia mira (Boettger, 1893)
 Voeltzkowia lineata (Mocquard, 1901)
 Voeltzkowia petiti (Angel, 1924)

Crocodilia

Crocodylidae
 Crocodylus niloticus (Laurenti, 1768)

Turtles

Cheloniidae
 Caretta caretta (Linnaeus, 1758)
 Chelonia mydas (Linnaeus, 1758)
 Eretmochelys imbricata (Linnaeus, 1766)
 Lepidochelys olivacea (Eschscholtz, 1829)

Dermochelyidae
 Dermochelys coriacea (Vandelli, 1761)

Pelomedusidae
 Pelomedusa subrufa (Bonnaterre, 1789)
 Pelusios subniger (Lacépède, 1789)
 Pelusios castanoides (Hewitt, 1931)

Podocnemididae
 Erymnochelys madagascariensis (Grandidier, 1867)

Tortoises (Testudinidae)
 Aldabrachelys abrupta (Grandidier, 1868)
 Aldabrachelys grandidieri (Vaillant, 1885)
 Astrochelys radiata (Shaw, 1802)
 Astrochelys yniphora (Vaillant, 1885)
 Kinixys zombensis (Hewitt, 1931)
 Pyxis arachnoides (Bell, 1827)
 Pyxis planicauda (Grandidier, 1867)

References

Madagascar
Reptiles
Reptiles of Madagascar
Madagascar